Pato Fu is a Brazilian indie rock band from Belo Horizonte, Minas Gerais. The band was formed by lead singer & rhythm guitarist Fernanda Takai, lead guitarist John Ulhoa and bassist Ricardo Koctus, in September 1992. Long-time drummer Xande Tamietti left the band in 2014, being replaced by Glauco Nastácia; keyboardist Richard Neves replaced Lulu Camargo in 2016. The band is also famous for their 2010 album Música de Brinquedo, which was written using only toy instruments. It was at one point included with U2 and Radiohead in a list of the 10 best bands in the world, according to Time magazine.

History 
Their first album, Rotomusic de Liquidificapum, was released in 1993, followed, since then, by other eight releases: Gol de Quem? (1995), Tem Mas Acabou (1996), Televisão de Cachorro (1998), Isopor (1999), Ruído Rosa (2000), MTV ao Vivo: No Museu de Arte da Pampulha (2002), Toda Cura para Todo Mal (2005), and Daqui Pro Futuro (2007), and with launch scheduled for 2010, Música de Brinquedo. The band's popularity began to increase simultaneously with two other groups from Belo Horizonte, Jota Quest and Skank. The band plays in alternative rock style, but resorting frequently to experimental music elements. Pato Fu is frequently said as being influenced by Os Mutantes, a famous Brazilian tropicalist group from the 1960s, probably because of the experimentalism found in both bands' songs. Their music is influenced by Devo, The Cure, Radiohead, Pizzicato Five, Super Furry Animals and also Brazilian Popular Music, among various others. Takai once said her singing is influenced by Suzanne Vega, of whom she is a fan.

Takai and Ulhoa are married and had a daughter, Nina, in 2003.

The band name is from a Garfield comic strip. Garfield attacked the mailman with his "Cat Fu" techniques. The band liked the wordplay, but decided to change Gato (cat) to Pato (duck). Coincidentally or not, the expression had also previously appeared in the Brazilian translation of the Howard the Duck movie, as the translation to the term "quack-fu".

The band celebrated its 10th anniversary in 2003 with the release of MTV ao Vivo: No Museu de Arte da Pampulha, a live performance with some of their most famous songs.

In 2010, Pato Fu recorded an album of brazilian and international rock classics played only with toy instruments called Música de Brinquedo, which generated a positive response from the public. Classics such as Live And Let Die and Rock And Roll Lullaby were present. A live DVD, called Música de Brinquedo Ao Vivo, was recorded in 2011.

In 2015, their album Não Pare Pra Pensar was nominated for the 16th Latin Grammy Awards in the Best Brazilian Rock Album category.

Band members 
Current members
 Fernanda Takai - lead vocals, acoustic guitar, rhythm guitar (1992–present)
 John Ulhoa - lead guitar, acoustic guitar, backing and lead vocals, cavaquinho (1992–present)
 Ricardo Koctus - bass guitar, backing vocals, pandeiro (1992–present)
 Glauco Nastácia - drums (2014–present)
 Richard Neves - keyboards, piano (2016–present)

Former members
 Dudu Tsuda - keyboards, piano (2008–2009)
 Xande Tamietti - drums (1996–2014)
 Lulu Camargo - keyboards, piano (2005–2016)

Touring members
 André Abujamra - guitar, piano (1996-1998)
 Hugo Hori - saxophone (1996)
 Tiquinho - trumpet (1996)
 Sérgio Bartolo - bass (1996)
 Haroldo Ferreti - drums (1993)

Discography 
Studio albums
 Rotomusic de Liquidificapum (1993)
 Gol de Quem? (1995) + 50,000
 Tem Mas Acabou (1996)
 Televisão de Cachorro (1998) + 100,000
 Isopor (1999) + 160,000
 Ruído Rosa (2001)
 Toda Cura para Todo Mal (2005) + 25,000
 Daqui Pro Futuro (2007)
 Música de Brinquedo (2010) + 40,000
 Não Pare Pra Pensar (2014) + 10,000

Live albums
 MTV ao Vivo - Pato Fu no Museu de Arte da Pampulha (2002)
 Música de Brinquedo Ao Vivo (2011) + 25,000

DVDs
 MTV ao Vivo - Pato Fu no Museu de Arte da Pampulha (2002)
 Video Clipes (2004)
 Toda Cura para Todo Mal (2007)
 Extra! Extra! (2009)
 Música de Brinquedo Ao Vivo (2011)

Singles

Hits 

 "Sobre o Tempo" (from Gol de Quem?)
 "Pinga" (from Tem Mas Acabou; the song's name refers to a Brazilian drink, cachaça)
 "Canção pra Você Viver Mais" (from Televisão de Cachorro; a tribute to Takai's father)
 "Antes Que Seja Tarde" (from Televisão de Cachorro)
 "Made in Japan" (from Isopor; sung almost entirely in Japanese.  It was written in Portuguese by John and translated by a Japanese teacher. Its video clip is a tribute to old Japanese Sci-Fi movies and a satire against Americanization, winning a Brazilian VMA award). The chorus comes from the song Mah Nà Mah Nà (see the article's "external links" section).
 "Depois" (from Isopor)
 "Perdendo Dentes" (from Isopor)
 "Eu" (from Ruído Rosa; a tribute to theremin)
 "Ando Meio Desligado" (from Ruído Rosa; Os Mutantes cover)
 "Por Perto" (from MTV ao Vivo)
 "Uh Uh Uh, Lá Lá Lá, Ié Ié!" (from Toda Cura para Todo Mal)
 "Sorte e Azar" (from Toda Cura para Todo Mal)
 "Anormal" (from Toda Cura para Todo Mal)
 "Rock And Roll Lullaby" (cover, toy instruments)

References

External links 
Official site (in Portuguese)

Musical groups established in 1992
Brazilian rock music groups
Musical groups from Belo Horizonte
Musical quartets
Brazilian musical trios
1992 establishments in Brazil